Habipler can refer to the following villages in Turkey:

 Habipler, Balya
 Habipler, Kahta
 Habipler, Kale